Group Captain William Dennis David , DFC & Bar,  (25 July 1918 – 25 August 2000) was a Welsh Royal Air Force flying ace credited with 11 aerial victories during the Battle of France.

Military career
David joined the RAFVR in 1937 and later obtained a short-service commission. In early 1939, he was posted to 87 Squadron, and he accompanied the squadron to France. On 10 May, the first day of the German invasion, David claimed his first aerial victories. He was awarded the DFC on 28 May, for his actions during the Battle of France, having shot down eleven aircraft in less than two weeks.

He was rested from operations in early 1941 and worked as a flight instructor.

References 

The Few
British World War II flying aces
Royal Air Force group captains
Royal Air Force pilots of World War II
Welsh aviators
1918 births
2000 deaths
Royal Air Force Volunteer Reserve personnel of World War II